The Germany national speedway team are motorcycle speedway national team from Germany.

2009 Team 
A members of 2009 Teams was approval in March 2009 by Deutscher Motor Sport Bund.

 Seniors:
 Martin Smolinski
 Kevin Wölbert
 Tobias Kroner
 Christian Hefenbrock
 Richard Speiser
 Thomas Stange
 U-21 Juniors:
 Kevin Wölbert
 Max Dilger
 Tobias Busch
 Frank Facher
 Erik Pudel
 Sonke Petersen
 U-19 Juniors:
 Erik Pudel
 Kai Huckenbeck
 René Deddens
 Marcel Helfer
 Franz Winklhofer

Speedway World Cup

Riders

Team U-21 World Championship

European Pairs Championship

Team U-19 European Championship

Honours

World Championships

European Championships

References

See also 
 motorcycle speedway

National speedway teams
Speedway
Team